James J. A. Gallagher (July 15, 1928 – February 5, 1992) was a Democratic member of the Pennsylvania House of Representatives.

Friends and fellow politicians described Gallagher as a joy to be associated with, and a courageous individual who dealt with his serious medical problems with a positive attitude. Both Milton Berkes, a lifelong family friend and political ally, and Thomas Mellon, chairman of the Bucks County Democratic Party, considered Gallagher a mentor. "Jim was, without a doubt, one of the great politicians I've ever known and one of the most courageous people I've ever known," Raddi said. "He had amazing determination and will."

A Philadelphia native, Gallagher moved to Levittown during the 1950s. He labored as a bus mechanic, and in 1957 he was asked by the Bristol Township Democratic Party to run for the state legislature against an incumbent, A. Patrick Brennan, whom he beat. Gallagher was very effective during his 28 years in Harrisburg, said Berkes, who was in the House with Gallagher between 1967 and 1974. "He was responsible for the legislation that created the Pennsylvania Higher Education Assistance Agency . . . that has enabled thousands of students to go to colleges in Pennsylvania," said Berkes. For 20 years, Gallagher was chairman of the House Education Committee. He also was a member of the Higher Education Assistance Agency for 18 years, chairing it for 10, and of the State School Building Authority for 12 years. For his efforts, he became known as the "education legislator" and was awarded an honorary doctorate by Temple University in 1986. He was the county Democrat of the Year in 1991, and was a member of the Bucks County Executive Committee. He was a trustee of the Bucks County Community College. He was a marine veteran of World War II. He was the first treasurer of the Bucks County Free Library. He was a director of the Livengrin Foundation.

References

External links

Democratic Party members of the Pennsylvania House of Representatives
1928 births
1992 deaths
20th-century American politicians
People from Levittown, Pennsylvania